Over the years of trams and tramways, there have been many designs of tramcars for use on the tramways, ranging from historical locomotives pulling wagons, to some of the preserved cars such as the Pantograph, Coronation, Balloon or Standard cars at the National Tramway Museum or at the Blackpool Tramway. During the 1990s and early 2000s there was a renaissance in UK tramways with several new networks opening and expanding, leading to a second generation of modern tramcars such as the Bombardier Incentro and the AnsaldoBreda T-68 and T-69s, as well as Sheffield's Supertram.

Modern Tramcar Stock

Blackpool Tramway
Bombardier Flexity 2

Edinburgh Tramway
CAF Urbos 3

Manchester Metrolink
AnsaldoBreda T-68 all withdrawn from service
Bombardier M5000

West Midlands Metro
AnsaldoBreda T-69 all withdrawn from service
CAF Urbos 3

Nottingham Express Transit
Bombardier Incentro
Alstom Citadis

Sheffield Supertram
Siemens-Duewag Supertram
Stadler Citylink tram-trains

Tramlink

(Croydon)

Bombardier CR4000
Stadler Variobahn

Preserved Tramcar Stock

Blackpool Tramway
Standard
English Electric Railcoach
Boat
Balloon
Brush Railcoach
Coronation
Progress Twin Set
OMO
Jubilee
Centenary
Illuminated Feature Cars

National Tramway Museum
Blackpool Conduit
Blackpool Dreadnought
Blackpool Toastrack
Blackpool Standard
Blackpool Pantograph
Blackpool Boat
Blackpool Balloon
Blackpool Brush Railcoach
Blackpool OMO
Blackpool Jubilee
Blackpool and Fleetwood Rack
Blackpool and Fleetwood Box

Tram vehicles of the United Kingdom